Arentz is a surname. Notable people with the surname include:

Bjarne Arentz (born 1928), Norwegian alpine skier
Charles Arentz (1878–1968), Norwegian sailor
Dick Arentz (born 1935), American fine art photographer and author
Frederik Arentz (1702–1779), Norwegian Lutheran bishop
Hans Severin Arentz (1806–1875), Norwegian politician
Samuel S. Arentz (1879–1934), American politician
Steven J. Arentz (born 1951), American politician